Star Spangled Salesman is a 1968 short film produced by the U.S. Department of the Treasury to promote the sale of Savings Bonds.

Premise
The film, directed by Norman Maurer, stars Howard Morris as a movie studio clerk who is assigned to get his colleagues interested in enrolling a payroll plan that is tied to the purchase of savings bonds.

Cast

Main
 Carl Reiner as himself
 Carol Burnett as Miss Grebs
 Milton Berle as Studio President
 Howard Morris as himself
 Joe DeRita as Curly Joe (as The Three Stooges)
 Larry Fine as Larry (as The Three Stooges)
 Moe Howard as Moe (as The Three Stooges)
 John Banner as Chef
 Werner Klemperer as Chef's Boss
 Rafer Johnson as Telephone Repairman
 Tim Conway as Telephone Repairman
 Harry Morgan as TV Cop
 Jack Webb as Security Man

Cameo/Uncredited
 Alexandra Hay as Blonde Girl

See also
List of American films of 1968

References

External links

1960s English-language films
The Three Stooges films
1968 short films
Columbia Pictures short films
1960s American films